"Tribal Voice" is a song by Australian musical group Yothu Yindi, released in September 1992 as the third and final single from Yothu Yindi's second studio album of the same name. "Tribal Voice" peaked at no. 56 on the ARIA Singles Chart.

Track listing
Australian CD single
 "Tribal Voice" – 4:14
 "Treaty" (K-Klass Club Mix) – 4:53
 "Djäpana (Sunset Dreaming)" (The Octopus Mix) – 4:36

Charts

References

1991 songs
1992 singles
Yothu Yindi songs
Songs about Australia